Balázs Lengyel (born 27 June 1980) is a Hungarian fencer. He competed in the individual and team sabre events at the 2004 Summer Olympics.

References

External links
 

1980 births
Living people
Hungarian male sabre fencers
Olympic fencers of Hungary
Fencers at the 2004 Summer Olympics
Martial artists from Budapest